Elton Martinez Carvalho Leme (born 1960) is a Brazilian who is employed as a judge. He is also a self-taught botanist with a special interest in bromeliads. , the International Plant Names Index listed 629 scientific names which include Leme as a publishing author, including 13 generic names.

Some publications

Journal articles

Books
English translation:

References

1960 births
Living people
20th-century Brazilian botanists
21st-century Brazilian botanists
Taxon authorities